The 1988 Australian Sports Car Championship was a CAMS sanctioned motor racing competition open to Group 2A Sports Cars (including Clubman cars at the sole discretion of CAMS), FISA C1 cars (up to 6 litres), FISA C2 cars (up to 5 litres) and Sports Sedans. The title, which was the 20th Australian Sports Car Championship, was contested over a four round series and was won by Alan Nolan, driving a Nola Chevrolet.

As of 2021 this is the final Australian Sports Car Championship contested.

Calendar

The championship was contested over a four round series with one race per round.

A fifth round, scheduled to be held at Calder Park, did not take place.

Classes
Competing cars were classified into one of three engine displacement classes:
 Up to 1.6 litres
 1.6 to 3 litres
 Over 3 litres

Points system
Championship points were awarded on a three tier system to the first twenty finishers in each round.

Results

References

External links
 Australian Sports Car Championship at www.racingsportscars.com

Australian Sports Car Championship
Sports Car Championship